Divundu (1.090 m above sea level) is a village on the south-eastern banks of the Okavango River in the Kavango East Region, Namibia,  east of Rundu. Divundu has a population of around 5,430 inhabitants and is homestead of the local Mbukushu kings.

On the opposite, north-eastern banks of the river lies Kakutji in Angola, and the two settlements are linked via a nearby border post.

Politics
Divundu is governed by a village council that has five seats. Athanasius Ndjamba Maghumbo is the CEO of Divundu Village Council (DVC).

SWAPO won the 2015 local authority election and gained four seats (631 votes). The remaining seat went to the All People's Party (APP) with 68 votes. SWAPO also won the 2020 local authority election, obtaining 433 votes and gaining three seats. One seat each went to the APP (100 votes) and the Independent Patriots for Change (IPC), an opposition party formed in August 2020, that gained 49 votes.

Tourism 
Game drives to the nearby national park, Bwabwata National Park, are well known for their diversity of wildlife in typical riverine and swampland habitat. Tourists frequent the Ndhovu Safari Lodge, which offers boat cruises to the Popa Falls, including camping and guided village tours to the local Kamutjonga village.

Notable people from Divundu
 Raphael Dinyando (1960–2013), former Deputy Minister of Information and Broadcasting

References 

Populated places in Kavango East
Villages in Namibia